Yemen War may refer to:

 Yemeni Civil War (disambiguation)
 Saudi–Yemeni War (1934)
 North Yemen Civil War (1962–1970)
 Yemenite War of 1972
 NDF Rebellion (1978–1982)
 Yemenite War of 1979
 South Yemen Civil War (1986)
 Yemeni Civil War (1994)
 Hanish Islands conflict (1995)
 Al-Qaeda insurgency in Yemen (1998–present)
 Houthi insurgency in Yemen (2004–2015)
 South Yemen insurgency (2009–2015)
 Yemeni Civil War (2014–present)
 Saudi Arabian–led intervention in Yemen (2015–present)
 Saudi–Yemeni border conflict (2015–present)